This episode list gives brief descriptions and some other details of the episodes of the ITV television series Minder, set in contemporary London.

The earliest episodes focus on Terry McCann (Dennis Waterman), a former professional boxer who has served time in jail and is determined not to return there. He finds himself in the orbit of Arthur Daley (George Cole), a middle-aged car salesman and self-described entrepreneur working on the edge of (and often beyond) the law in pursuit of a quick profit. Terry works for Arthur as an assistant/bodyguard (known as a 'minder'), and is often loaned out by Arthur to work for others in a similar capacity. Over the course of the first three series, the focus of the show shifts so that the ever-scheming Arthur moves from being a supporting character to co-lead with Terry.

Series 1–7 (first broadcast from 1979 to 1985, then in 1989) feature both Terry and Arthur. Two TV films were also made between series 6 and 7, broadcast on Christmas Day 1985 and Boxing Day 1988. Terry was written out of the show after series 7.

Series 8–10 (first broadcast in 1991, 1993 and 1994) focus on Arthur Daley, older but no wiser, and his nephew Ray Daley (Gary Webster) as his new minder/assistant. Series 11 (first broadcast in 2009 on Channel 5) was a short-lived revival of the programme with a completely new cast.

George Cole died on 5 August 2015, and Glynn Edwards (who played barman Dave Harris) on 23 May 2018. Following the death of Dennis Waterman on 8 May 2022, Gary Webster is the only surviving member of the regular cast.

Series overview
Series 1: 29 October 1979 to 21 January 1980 - (11 episodes)
Series 2: 11 September 1980 to 18 December 1980 - (13 episodes)
Series 3: 13 January 1982 to 7 April 1982 - (13 episodes)
Series 4: 26 December 1983 to 21 March 1984 - (12 episodes)
Series 5: 5 September 1984 to 26 December 1984 - (9 episodes)
Series 6: 4 September 1985 to 25 December 1985 - (7 episodes)
Series 7: 26 December 1988 to 6 February 1989 - (6 episodes)
Series 8: 5 September 1991 to 25 December 1991 - (13 episodes)
Series 9: 7 January 1993 to 1 April 1993 - (13 episodes)
Series 10: 6 January 1994 to 10 March 1994 - (10 episodes)
Series 11: 4 February 2009 to 11 March 2009 - (6 episodes)

Dennis Waterman Era (1979–1989)

Series 1 (1979-80)
Broadcast: 29 October 1979 – 21 January 1980 (ITV)
Regular cast: Dennis Waterman as Terry McCann, George Cole as Arthur Daley, Glynn Edwards as Dave Harris.

Series 2 (1980)
First broadcast: 11 September – 18 December 1980 (ITV)
Regular cast: Dennis Waterman as Terry McCann, George Cole as Arthur Daley, Glynn Edwards as Dave Harris.

Series 3 (1982)
Broadcast: 13 January – 7 April 1982 (ITV)
Regular cast: Dennis Waterman as Terry McCann, George Cole as Arthur Daley, Glynn Edwards as Dave Harris.

Series 4 (1984)
Broadcast: 26 December 1983 – 21 March 1984 (ITV)
Regular cast: Dennis Waterman as Terry McCann, George Cole as Arthur Daley, Glynn Edwards as Dave Harris.

Series 5 (1984)
Broadcast: 5 September – 26 December 1984 (ITV)
Regular cast: Dennis Waterman as Terry McCann, George Cole as Arthur Daley, Glynn Edwards as Dave Harris.

Series 6 (1985)
Broadcast: 4 September – 26 December 1985 (ITV)
Regular cast: Dennis Waterman as Terry McCann, George Cole as Arthur Daley, Glynn Edwards as Dave Harris.

Series 7 (1988-89)
Broadcast: 26 December 1988 – 6 February 1989 (ITV)
Regular cast: Dennis Waterman as Terry McCann, George Cole as Arthur Daley, Glynn Edwards as Dave Harris.

Gary Webster era (1991–1994)

Series 8 (1991)
Broadcast: 5 September – 25 December 1991 (ITV)
Regular cast: George Cole as Arthur Daley, Gary Webster as Ray Daley, Glynn Edwards as Dave Harris.

Series 9 (1993)
 Broadcast 7 January 1993 – 1 April 1993 (ITV)
Regular cast: George Cole as Arthur Daley, Gary Webster as Ray Daley, Glynn Edwards as Dave Harris

Series 10 (1994)
Broadcast 6 January 1994 – 10 March 1994
Regular cast: George Cole as Arthur Daley, Gary Webster as Ray Daley, Glynn Edwards as Dave Harris

Channel 5 series (2009)

Series 11 (2009)

References

External links
The Unofficial Fans of Minder No 1 fans site on the web since 1997
Minder discussion forum

Minder (TV series)